Toman may refer to:

 Toman (name)
 Iranian toman, former Iranian currency unit and planned replacement for the rial
 Malay term for the giant snakehead 
 Toman (film), a 2018 Czech historical film